The South African Railways Class 33-200 of 1966 was a diesel-electric locomotive.

Between October 1966 and May 1967 the South African Railways placed twenty Class 33-200 General Motors Electro-Motive Division type GL26MC diesel-electric locomotives in service.

Manufacturer
The Class 33-200 type GM-EMD GL26MC diesel-electric locomotive was designed and built for the South African Railways (SAR) by General Motors Electro-Motive Division (GM-EMD) and imported.

Class 33 series
The Class 33-200 was the first GM-EMD diesel-electric locomotive to be placed in service by the SAR. The Class 33 consisted of three series, the General Electric (GE) Class 33-000 and 33-400 and the GM-EMD Class . Both manufacturers also produced locomotives for the subsequent SAR Classes 34, 35 and 36.

Of the three series, the Class 33-200 was the only one to be delivered with a high short hood.

Service

South African Railways
The Class 33-200 locomotives spent their entire SAR working lives operating out of East London. After some of the locomotives were sold by the SAR, their dynamic braking equipment, located in the high short hood, was removed by some of the new owners and the short hoods were rebuilt to low noses.

Between 1991 and 1992, the remaining Spoornet locomotives were similarly modified and placed in shunting service around East London. All of them were eventually withdrawn and sold by Spoornet and several are still operating in other parts of Africa.

Sheltam
Of the original twenty locomotives, eleven were still in service with Sheltam by 2010, two having first served at Douglas Colliery as numbers D8 and D9. Sheltam is a locomotive leasing and repair company. All their serving Class 33-200 locomotives have had their short hoods modified to low noses.

Three more locomotives were bought by Sheltam for spare parts and are believed now to be scrapped. Sheltam initially numbered all their locomotives from no. 1 upwards, but have since renumbered them according to their horsepower.

Other operators
Of the remainder, four locomotives went to SitaRail in Côte d'Ivoire, one to the Sudan Railways and one to the Nkana mine of Mopani Copper Mines in Zambia.

Works numbers
The Class 33-200 builder's works numbers and disposition are listed in the table.

Illustration
The main picture shows Class 33-200 no. 33-212 on 8 January 1970 with its original high short hood and in the SAR Gulf Red livery, leading General Electric-built Class  no. 33-023 on a passenger train near Vincent, Eastern Cape. The following pictures show some of these locomotives with low short hoods in various liveries.

References

3330
C-C locomotives
Co′Co′ locomotives
Co+Co locomotives
Electro-Motive Division locomotives
Cape gauge railway locomotives
Railway locomotives introduced in 1966
1966 in South Africa